Frank Albert Picard (October 19, 1889 – February 28, 1963) was a United States district judge of the United States District Court for the Eastern District of Michigan.

Education and career

Born in Saginaw, Michigan, Picard received a Bachelor of Laws from the University of Michigan Law School in 1912. He was an assistant prosecuting attorney of Saginaw County, Michigan in 1913. He was in private practice of law in Saginaw from 1913 to 1917. He was in the United States Army as a Captain from 1917 to 1919. He returned to private practice in Saginaw from 1919 to 1939. He was city attorney of Saginaw from 1924 to 1928. He was a candidate for the United States Senate from Michigan in 1934.

Federal judicial service

Picard was nominated by President Franklin D. Roosevelt on February 9, 1939, to the United States District Court for the Eastern District of Michigan, to a new seat created by 52 Stat. 584. He was confirmed by the United States Senate on February 16, 1939, and received his commission on February 23, 1939. He served as Chief Judge in 1959. He assumed senior status on March 31, 1959. His service was terminated on February 28, 1963, due to his death.

References

Sources
 

1889 births
1963 deaths
Politicians from Saginaw, Michigan
Military personnel from Michigan
Judges of the United States District Court for the Eastern District of Michigan
United States district court judges appointed by Franklin D. Roosevelt
20th-century American judges
United States Army officers
University of Michigan Law School alumni
United States Army personnel of World War I